Christopher Daniel Harold (born 14 July 1992) is an Australian professional football (soccer) player who plays as a forward for National Premier Leagues club ECU Joondalup.

Born in Perth, Western Australia, Harold started his professional career with Gold Coast United in 2010 after coming through the club's youth team. He returned to Perth to play for Perth Glory in 2012 following the dissolution of Gold Coast United. In January 2020, he joined Central Coast Mariners.

Harold featured twice for Australian youth national sides.

Club career
Originally from Perth, Harold spent most of his childhood in Singapore and Malaysia. In 2009, Harold trained for two weeks at the Manchester United Academy.

Harold made his first senior debut Gold Coast United on 26 September 2010. He came on as a 77th-minute substitute for Steve Fitzsimmons in the 1–1 draw with Sydney FC at the Sydney Football Stadium.

In 2012 Harold returned to Perth to sign with Perth Glory.

After 8 years with Perth Glory, Harold departed in January 2020 to join Central Coast Mariners on a short-term contract. In July 2020, following the suspension of the 2019–20 A-League due to the COVID-19 pandemic, the Mariners announced that Harold would not be rejoining the squad for the final four games of the season for personal reasons. In October 2020, Harold retired from professional football aged 28, citing frustration and feeling disenfranchised with the A-League and the sport in Australia.

Harold joined former Glory coach Kenny Lowe at ECU Joondalup in the National Premier Leagues.

International career
Harold was selected to tour to South America with the Australian Young Socceroos in March 2010.

On 7 March 2011 he was selected to represent the Australia Olympic football team in an Asian Olympic Qualifier match against Iraq.

After football
Harold has a law degree and joined a law firm in Perth following his retirement from football. As of 2021, he remains Perth Glory's record A-League appearances holder.

Career statistics

Honours

Club
Gold Coast United:
 National Youth League Championship: 2009–2010

Perth Glory
 A-League Premiership: 2018–19

See also
List of Central Coast Mariners FC players
List of Gold Coast United FC players
List of Perth Glory FC players

References

External links

1992 births
Living people
Soccer players from Sydney
Gold Coast United FC players
A-League Men players
Perth Glory FC players
Central Coast Mariners FC players
Perth RedStar FC players
People educated at Brisbane State High School
National Premier Leagues players
Association football forwards
Australian soccer players